Talking Heads were an American new wave band who, between 1975 and 1991, recorded 96 songs, 12 of which were not officially released until after their break-up. The group has been described as "one of the most acclaimed bands of the post-punk era" by AllMusic and among the most "adventurous" bands in rock history by the Rock and Roll Hall of Fame.

After leaving art school, Talking Heads released their debut single, "Love → Building on Fire", in early 1977, followed by their debut album, Talking Heads: 77, later that year. The album contained  "stripped down rock & roll" songs and was notable for its "odd guitar-tunings and rhythmic, single note patterns" and its "non-rhyming, non-linear lyrics". While initially not a big hit, the album was aided by the single "Psycho Killer". The band's follow-up, More Songs About Buildings and Food (1978), began the band's string of collaborations with producer Brian Eno. Its songs are characterized as more polished than its predecessor, emphasizing experimentation and the rhythm section, as well as the genres of art pop and funk. The experimentation continued on Fear of Music (1979), in which the band began utilizing African-styled polyrhythms, most notably on the album's opening track "I Zimbra". The style and sound of Fear of Music was expanded upon on their final Eno collaboration, Remain in Light (1980). Often classified as their magnum opus and one of the best albums of the 1980s, the album integrated several new musicians, including a horn section, which helped the band further experiment on their African-style rhythms and their use of funk, pop, and electronics. After Remain in Light, the band went on a three-year hiatus and worked on solo projects. During their hiatus, the live album The Name of This Band Is Talking Heads (1982), was released; it features live recordings of songs from their four albums to date, as well as the previously unreleased song "A Clean Break".

In 1983, the band parted ways with Eno and released their fifth album, Speaking in Tongues (1983). The album continued the rhythmic innovation of Remain in Light, but in a more stripped-down, rigid pop song structure. The album also contained the band's first and only top ten hit, "Burning Down the House". The band's sixth album, Little Creatures (1985), marked a major musical departure from their previous albums – its songs being straightforward pop songs mostly written by Byrne alone. After Little Creatures, the band released True Stories (1986), an album containing songs from Byrne's film of the same name. Notable songs from the album include one of the group's biggest hits, "Wild Wild Life", and "Radio Head", a song from which the English rock band of the same name took their name. Two years later, Talking Heads released their final album, Naked. The album marked a return to the experimentation and styles of their Eno albums, most notably Remain in Light. After Naked, the band went on a hiatus; formally announcing their breakup three years later in 1991. Their final release was the song "Sax and Violins", released on the Until the End of the World soundtrack that same year.

Since their breakup, 12 previously unreleased songs have been officially released. The compilation album Sand in the Vaseline: Popular Favorites (1992) included five and the box set Once in a Lifetime (2003) included one, "In Asking Land", an outtake from the Naked sessions. The 2005 reissue of Talking Heads: 77 included the previously unreleased "I Feel It in My Heart", and the 2006 reissues of Fear of Music and Remain in Light included unfinished outtakes from those albums' sessions.

Songs

Notes

References

Talking Heads